Terje Olsen (born 1981), known professionally as Todd Terje, is a Norwegian DJ, songwriter, and record producer. His stage name is a homage to house music producer Todd Terry.

Called "King of the summer jams" by Mixmag, "one third of the Holy Trinity of Norwegian disco" by Spin magazine, and "one of [the Scandinavian dance scene's] prominent figures" by AllMusic, Todd Terje made his name with a string of remixes and re-edits in the mid 2000s. He is the younger brother of Olaf Olsen, known as the drummer from Bigbang, who often performs drums for Terje's live shows.

He was one of the headliners at the prestigious Sónar festival in Barcelona, playing alongside frequent collaborator Lindstrøm. He was listed at #17 in the Rolling Stone magazine list of "The 25 DJs That Rule the Earth". In July 2013 he recorded a mix for BBC Radio 1's Essential Mix series. He is best known for his 2012 house track "Inspector Norse". The song Alfonso Muskedunder was featured in an episode of the third season of the television series Better Call Saul on AMC. The introduction to It's Album Time is regularly referenced in a feature in Radio 1 DJ, Huw Stephens' late night show.

In 2017, he was nominated for Record of the Year for the Four Tet Remix of his song "Jungelknugen" at the Electronic Music Awards. The original version of this track, however, has not been released officially as of  December 2021.

Collaborations
Terje co-wrote the Robbie Williams song "Candy" that reached the Top 10 charts in many European countries and reached #1 on the UK charts.

In 2013, Terje collaborated with Scottish indie rock band Franz Ferdinand on material for their fourth studio album, Right Thoughts, Right Words, Right Action, co-producing two tracks.

He mixed and edited Lindstrøm's album Smalhans, which led to further collaboration. The pair recorded the single "Lanzarote", which was released on Olsen Records in January 2013, and later in the year embarked on a tour that included gigs at Nuits Sonores, Sónar, and Melt!.. 
Throughout 2014 and 2015, Terje has performed on multiple festivals across the world, such as Coachella, Lowlands and Pitchfork Festival. On stage, he is joined by his brother Olaf and percussionist Martin Windstad.

Terje recorded a cover of Robert Palmer's 1980 single "Johnny & Mary" with Bryan Ferry. The track appeared on Terje's debut album It's Album Time and was also released as a single.

In 2016, Todd Terje released The Big Cover-Up, an EP consisting of covers by Disco artists, such as Boney M and Yellow Magic Orchestra as Todd Terje and the Olsens.

Discography

Studio albums

Compilations

Extended plays

Singles

Vinyl singles

Remixes

Edits
Todd Terje has many unofficially released disco edits under various pseudonyms. Many of them are released without credits. List contains officially released edits.

References

External links
Official Website
Resident Advisor Feature
Todd Terje discography at Discogs

Living people
Norwegian electronic musicians
Norwegian record producers
Norwegian DJs
Remixers
Nu-disco musicians
1981 births
Electronic dance music DJs
Musicians from Drammen
Smalltown Supersound artists